American singer and songwriter Billie Eilish has released 2 studio albums, 1 live album, 1 video album, 2 extended plays (EPs), 33 singles, and 25 music videos. According to RIAA, she has sold 41.5 million digital singles and 5 million albums. IFPI crowned "Bad Guy" as 2019's biggest selling single globally, selling 19.5 million units in a year span. Eilish is regarded by various media outlets as the "Queen of Gen-Z Pop". At age 17, she became the youngest female artist in UK chart history to score a number-one album. As of October 2021, Eilish has accumulated 76.7 billion career streams worldwide. According to IFPI, Eilish was the 4th best-selling artist of 2019 and 5th best-selling artist of 2020.

In August 2017, Eilish released her first EP, Don't Smile at Me, which reached number 14 on the US Billboard 200, number 12 on the UK Albums Chart, and the top 10 in Australia, New Zealand, and Sweden. Eilish then released the internationally charting singles such as "Lovely" (with Khalid), "You Should See Me in a Crown", "When the Party's Over", "Come Out and Play", "Bury a Friend", "Wish You Were Gay", "Bad Guy", "Everything I Wanted", "My Future", and "Therefore I Am".

Her debut studio album, When We All Fall Asleep, Where Do We Go? was released on March 29, 2019, and peaked at number one in 15 countries around the world including the US, UK, Australia, and Canada. It has sold 1.2 million units globally in 2019 alone, making it the fifth biggest seller of the year. "Bad Guy" became Eilish's first single to debut in the top 10 of Billboard Hot 100, peaking at number one. With "Bad Guy", she became the first artist born in the 21st century and third Gen Z artist to have a number one song on the Hot 100, as well as the first to have a number-one album on the Billboard 200. Eilish also broke the record for the most simultaneous hits on Billboard Hot 100 among women.Darkroom and Interscope records released her second studio album, Happier Than Ever, on July 30, 2021, containing 16 tracks. Like her previous album, it peaked at number one in several countries including the US, UK, Australia, and Canada. The album earned its spot at No. 1 on the Billboard 200 chart. In 2022, the latest #1 sophomore album received a total of seven GRAMMY nominations, including Record of the Year, Best Music Video, Song of the Year, Album of the Year, and Best Pop Vocal Album. Happier than ever incorporates elements of many versatile genres including; downtempo, bossa nova, electropop, R&B, and jazz-pop, which Eilish claims was the biggest inspiration musically based on  her favorite singers, Frank Sinatra and Peggy Lee. The recording of the album began on April 1, 2020, during the COVID-19 pandemic which she co-wrote with her brother, Finneas O' Connell, also a singer/songwriter and producer. On July 21, 2022, she surprise-released her second EP, Guitar Songs, which consists of two tracks, "TV" and "The 30th".

Albums

Studio albums

Live albums

Extended plays

Live extended plays

Singles

Other charted and certified songs

Guest appearances

Songwriting credits

Videography

Video albums

Music videos

Notes

References

Discography
Discographies of American artists
Pop music discographies